Maci may refer to:

Maci, Guinea, a town and sub-prefecture in the Pita Prefecture in the Mamou Region of northern-central Guinea
Iceve-Maci, a Tivoid language of the Cameroons
Maci (medical treatment), a treatment for joint degeneration
Maci (footballer), a Romanian beach soccer player
Maci Bookout (born 1991), American reality television personality, author, and public speaker
Maci (politician) (1652–1739), politician of Qing China
Rexhep Maçi (1912–1980), Albanian football player